The 1908 Baylor Bears football team represented Baylor University as an independent during the 1908 college football season. In their first season under head coach Enoch J. Mills, the Bears compiled a 3–5 record and were outscored by opponents by a combined total of 164 to 48. They played their home games at Carroll Field in Waco, Texas. Charles A. Gantt was the team captain.

Schedule

References

Baylor
Baylor Bears football seasons
Baylor Bears football